A number of steamships have carried the name Malmö

, built by Motala Mekaniska verkstad, Karlshamn
, built by Kockums, Malmö
, built by Kjöbenhavns Flydk & Skbs, Copenhagen
, built by H C Stülcken Sohn, Hamburg

Ship names